We Are the Streets is the second studio album by hip hop group The Lox. The album was released on January 25, 2000, by Ruff Ryders Entertainment and Interscope Records. It was their second album as a group, and is mainly produced by Swizz Beatz. Its commercial success was driven primarily by the hit singles "Wild Out," produced by Swizz Beatz, and "Ryde or Die, Bitch", produced by Timbaland.

Track listing

Charts

Weekly charts

Year-end charts

References

D-Block Records albums
2000 albums
Albums produced by DJ Premier
Albums produced by Swizz Beatz
Albums produced by Timbaland
The Lox albums
Ruff Ryders Entertainment albums
Gangsta rap albums by American artists